Fjordia is a genus of sea slugs, specifically aeolid nudibranchs, marine gastropod molluscs in the family Coryphellidae.

Species 
Species within the genus Fjordia are as follows:
 Fjordia browni (Picton, 1980)
 Fjordia capensis (Thiele, 1925)
 Fjordia chriskaugei Korshunova, Martynov, Bakken, Evertsen, Fletcher, Mudianta, Saito, Lundin, Schrödl & Picton, 2017
 Fjordia insolita (Garcia-Gomez & Cervera, 1989)
 Fjordia lineata (Lovén, 1846)

References

Coryphellidae
Gastropod genera